Leptorchestes separatus is a jumping spider species in the genus Leptorchestes that lives in Namibia. It was first described in 2001.

References

Endemic fauna of Namibia
Salticidae
Fauna of Namibia
Spiders of Africa
Spiders described in 2001
Taxa named by Wanda Wesołowska